Christopher Alan Willmott (born 30 September 1977, in Bedford, England) is an English retired footballer.

Willmott began his career at Luton Town, before a move to Wimbledon alongside teammate Kelvin Davis. He returned to Luton on loan in 2002/03, and was all set to return on a Bosman transfer in the summer of 2003 as well as fellow loanee Sammy Igoe.

However, the take-over and subsequent dismissal of the Luton management team saw Willmott join Northampton Town instead, where he scored once against Cambridge United. In the summer of 2005, Willmott joined Oxford United on a free transfer from Northampton. 'Motty' missed the majority of the 2007/08 season through a knee injury. 

He was released by Oxford United at the end of the 2008/09 season. Willmott signed a two-year contract with Southern League Premier Division side Brackley Town. Willmott then played for Conference North team Oxford City where he was vice-captain.

After retiring from football he went into teaching, becoming a master at Bedford Modern School.

In 2022, Willmott joined AFC Rushden and Diamonds as assistant manager.

In October 2022, Chris Willmott joined Kettering Town FC as first team coach and assistant to the manager, Lee Glover.

References

External links

1977 births
Living people
Sportspeople from Bedford
English footballers
Association football defenders
Luton Town F.C. players
Wimbledon F.C. players
Northampton Town F.C. players
Oxford United F.C. players
Oxford City F.C. players
Premier League players
English Football League players
National League (English football) players
Brackley Town F.C. players
Footballers from Bedfordshire